"Skin on Skin" is a song by German singer–songwriter Sarah Connor from her second studio album, Unbelievable (2002). Written and produced by Rob Tyger and Kay Denar, the song was released as the album's second single on 4 November 2002 and reached the top 10 in Austria, the Czech Republic, Germany, and Portugal.

Track listings
German CD single
 "Skin on Skin" (radio version) – 4:02
 "Skin on Skin" (US college radio version) – 4:02

European CD single
 "Skin on Skin" (radio version) – 4:02
 "Skin on Skin" (Kayrob dance remix) – 4:03

European CD maxi-single
 "Skin on Skin" (radio version) – 4:02
 "Skin on Skin" (US college radio version) – 4:02
 "Skin on Skin" (album version) – 4:44
 "Skin on Skin" (Kayrob dance remix) – 4:03
 "En Mi Piel" (Spanish radio version) – 4:02
 "Skin on Skin" (video) – 4:02

Charts

Weekly charts

Year-end charts

References

2002 singles
2002 songs
Epic Records singles
Sarah Connor (singer) songs
Songs written by Kay Denar
Songs written by Rob Tyger
X-Cell Records singles